Effigy were an Australian three-piece indie pop/synth band, formed in Perth in 1994.  The band originally consisted of Peter Hardman (vocals, guitar, harmonica), and Annie Beckerling (bass), and Jason Stacey (drums). The band signed to US label, Roadrunner Records, one of the label's first Australian signings, and relocated to Melbourne. 

The group released their debut self-titled album, Effigy, in 1997, with the track, "I Give In", placing at No. 100 in the Triple J Hottest 100 for 1997.

Beckerling left the band during the earlier stages of recording their second album and was replaced by Cobina Crawford (ex-Sourpuss). Their second album, Century Collapsing, produced by Kalju Tonuma (The Sharp, Nick Barker, The Mavis's) and Hardman, was released in August 1998 and debuted at No. 68 on the Australian album charts, peaking at No. 65. The first single from the album, "Suspicion Bells", reached No. 90 on the Australian singles chart but the second single, "Caught", failed to chart. They toured nationally in support of The Mavis's and broke up shortly afterwards.

Hardman subsequently moved back to Perth and formed a new version of Effigy as a four-piece, with Rob T (drums), Micheal Boddington (guitar, keyboards) and Peter Twilby (bass).

Discography

Albums

Singles

References 

Musical groups from Perth, Western Australia
Musical groups established in 1994
1994 establishments in Australia
1998 disestablishments in Australia
Musical groups disestablished in 1998
Australian indie pop groups